Sofia Margareta Götschenhjelm-Helin (born 25 April 1972) is a Swedish actress. She was nominated for a Guldbagge Award for her role in Dalecarlians, and stars as Saga Norén in the Danish/Swedish co-produced TV series The Bridge (Danish: Broen; Swedish: Bron).

Early life and education
Sofia Helin was born in Hovsta in Örebro, Närke. Her father was a salesman and her mother was a nurse.  When she was 10 days old, her grandmother and her six-year-old brother were in a car accident; her grandmother survived, but her brother was killed. From 1994 to 1996, she went to Calle Flygares theatre school and graduated from the Stockholm Theatre Academy in 2001. She was brought up in Linghem, outside Linköping but in 2015 was living in Stockholm.

Career
Helin played the leading role of Chief Inspector Klara in the film At Point Blank (Rånarna) in 2003. In 2004, she took the leading role of Mia in Masjävlar, and was nominated for a Guldbagge award. In 2007 she played the leading role of Cecilia Algottsdotter in Arn, an adaptation of Jan Guillou's The Knight Templar, about Arn Magnusson. She also featured in the Swedish animated film Metropia (2009).

She became famous outside Sweden after 2012, when the first series of the highly successful TV crime drama series The Bridge went to air. In it, she played Saga Norén, a homicide detective from Malmö. In the UK, the series attracted more than a million viewers per episode, and she was called a role model for women with Asperger syndrome. The fourth season of the series aired in 2018.

In 2015, she starred in a Danish science fiction film called Fang Rung. In the same year, she acted in a British/German TV series directed by Oliver Hirschbiegel, about divided Berlin in the 1970s, called The Same Sky, in which she spoke in both German and English. The series was shot in Prague.

Helin plays an archaeologist in series 2 of the 2020 Australian TV crime drama Mystery Road.

Personal life
Helin is married to Daniel Götschenhjelm, a priest in the Church of Sweden and former actor whom she met at drama school. She has two children: a son, Ossian, aged  and a daughter, Nike, aged  (as of  ). Helin is a Christian.

Helin has a facial scar resulting from a cycling accident when she was 24.

Filmography
Rederiet (1997)
Tusenbröder (2002)
Beck – Sista vittnet (2002)
At Point Blank (2003)
Four Shades of Brown (2004)
Dalecarlians (Masjävlar) (2004)
Blodsbröder (2005)
Nina Frisk (2007)
Arn – The Knight Templar (2007)
Arn – The Kingdom at Road's End (2008)
Metropia - Swedish animated film (2009)
Gåten Ragnarok (2013)
The Bridge (Broen/Bron) - TV series (2011–2018)
The Same Sky - TV series (2017)
That Good Night (2017)
The Snowman (2017)
Mystery Road (series 2) - TV series (2020)
Atlantic Crossing - TV series (2020)

References

External links

1972 births
Living people
People from Örebro Municipality
People from Närke
Swedish film actresses
Swedish television actresses
20th-century Swedish actresses
Swedish Christians
21st-century Swedish actresses